Magapiidae is a family of cnidarians belonging to the order Anthoathecata.

Genera:
 Fabienna Schuchert, 1996
 Kantiella Bouillon, 1978
 Magapia Schuchert & Bouillon, 2009

References

Filifera
Cnidarian families